Kunigunde of Sternberg (18 November 1425, Konopiště – 19 November 1449, Poděbrady) was the first wife of George of Poděbrady, who later became King of Bohemia.

Life 
Kunigunde's parents were the Bohemian nobles Smil of Sternberg (d. 1431) and Barbara of Pardubice (d. 1433). In 1441 she married the 21-year-old George of Poděbrady, who had been captain of the old Bohemian circle of Stará Boleslav since 1440. This marriage produced three sons:
 Boček (1442–1496)
 Victor (1443–1500) and
 Henry the Elder (1448–1498)

and three daughters:
 Barbara (1446–1474), married first with Henry of Lipé (Jindřich z Lipé, d. 1469), and second with Jan Křinecký of Ronov
 Catherine (1449–1464), married Matthias, King of Hungary; and
 Zdenka (1449–1510) (also known as Sidonie of Poděbrady; Catherine's twin)

In 1444 Kunigunde founded a hospital in Poděbrady. It was named after her and remained in operation until the beginning of the 20th century. She also established a foundation for youth education, school construction and rehabilitation of prisoners.

She died in 1449, the day after her twenty-fourth birthday and 9 days after giving birth to twin daughters. She was buried in the parish church Exaltation of the Holy Cross in Poděbrady.

External links

Footnotes 

Sternberg
Sternberg
Sternberg
Deaths in childbirth
Podiebrad family
Sternberg family
15th-century Bohemian people
15th-century Bohemian women